Maria Jelinek (birth name Maria Jelínková; born November 16, 1942) is a Canadian former pair skater. With her brother Otto, she is the 1962 World champion, the 1961 North American champion, and 1961–1962 Canadian national champion. They represented Canada at the 1960 Winter Olympics, where they placed 4th.

Personal life 
The Jelinek family fled to Canada from Czechoslovakia in 1948 at the beginning of the Cold War. The Czechoslovak government withdrew their citizenship in 1961.

Maria Jelinek currently resides in Oakville, Ontario.

Career 
The Jelineks trained at the Oakville Skating Club. In 1955, they became the Canadian national champions at the junior level and took silver at the senior level the following year. In 1957, the pair won the silver medal at the North American Championships and the first of their four World Championship medals, a bronze. After taking bronze again in 1958, they finished just off the World podium in 1959 and then won silver in 1960. They placed fourth at the 1960 Winter Olympics held at Squaw Valley near Lake Tahoe, California. Preparing for the Olympic competition, the Jelineks put together a complex and difficult routine involving several lifts, lasting five minutes. Shortly before their trip to Squaw Valley, they still struggled to complete their routine. Their coaches asked for help from Wilfrid Shute, MD, cardiologist and prominent advocate for vitamin E nutrition. Dr. Shute's daughter also trained at the Oakville Skating Club and had the same coaches as did the Jelineks. Dr. Shute prescribed 1600 international units of vitamin E daily for the Jelineks. That enabled them to complete their routine easily and perform it at Squaw Valley — at  elevation— without resorting to oxygen masks.

After placing second four times, the Jelineks won their first Canadian senior title in 1961. The pair had a bad fall a day before the North American Championships, resulting in a concussion to Otto and a large gash in Maria's thigh, however, they competed and won gold. They decided to compete at the 1961 World Championships to be hosted by Prague, despite the risk to citizens who had fled. After the International Skating Union threatened to change the host, the Czechoslovak government resolved the dispute by stripping the pair's citizenship. The competition, however, was cancelled due to the Sabena Flight 548 crash which killed the entire U.S. team. The Jelineks had planned to travel with the Americans to Prague but missed the flight because they were waiting for their coach, Bruce Hyland, whose wife was about to give birth.

The Jelineks won the national title again in 1962 and went on to win gold at the 1962 World Championships in their city of birth.

Although Maria Jelinek was tall for a pair skater, at 5' 7", they were the first pair to perform lifts with several rotations. They also performed side-by-side double jumps.

The Jelineks retired from competition later in 1962, and toured professionally with Ice Capades. They were inducted into Canada's Sports Hall of Fame in 1962 and into the Skate Canada Hall of Fame in 1994.

Results
with Otto Jelinek

References

 Beverley Smith, Figure Skating: A Celebration.  .

External links
 "Otto & Maria Jelinek - Ice Capades of 1965," video 
 
 

1942 births
Living people
Czechoslovak emigrants to Canada
Canadian people of Czech descent
Canadian female pair skaters
Olympic figure skaters of Canada
Figure skaters at the 1960 Winter Olympics
Figure skaters from Prague
World Figure Skating Championships medalists